Bisi bele bhath or bisi bele huliyanna is a spicy, rice-based dish with origins in the state of Karnataka, India. It is said to have originated in the Mysore Palace and it took 100 years for the dish to come out from the place and another 200 years to spread across the state of Karnataka.

Preparation

The traditional preparation of this dish is quite elaborate and involves the use of spicy masala (huliyanna), toor dal (a type of lentil), rice, ghee and vegetables. Spices like nutmeg, asafoetida, curry leaves and tamarind pulp contribute to its unique flavour and taste. Some versions of the dish are prepared with up to thirty ingredients.

It is served hot and sometimes eaten with chutney, boondi, salad, papad, or potato chips. This dish is commonly found in restaurants that serve the Udupi cuisine. The masala used is available off the shelf.

See also
 Cuisine of Karnataka
 List of rice dishes

References

Karnataka cuisine
Indian rice dishes